Nicoletta Romanoff (born Nicoletta Consolo, 14 May 1979) is an Italian television and film actress.

Acting career
Romanoff made her cinematic debut in the 2003 Italian film Remember Me, My Love, directed by Gabriele Muccino. She played the role of Valentina, a teenage girl aggressively pursuing dreams of show business fame. As a film critic described her performance, "Ms. Romanoff, who more or less steals the movie, is completely believable as an Italian post-Britney material girl who is all drive and no modesty." Another critic described Valentina's pivotal role in sustaining the film's tone: "There are occasional flashes of the sardonic tone which promised so much at the start - mostly when the focus is on Valentina's more extreme acts of narcissism. Then Muccino seems to forget how appalling she is and starts applauding these egocentricities as signs of her unquenchable spirit." (translated)

Romanoff has also played lead roles in the 2007 comedy film Cardiofitness and the 2010 film Dalla vita in poi.

Personal
Romanoff is the daughter of an Italian politician, Giuseppe Consolo and his wife, Princess Natalija Nikolaevna Romanov, from who she gets her stage name. (Romanoff is a  variant  romanization of the Russian surname Romanov.) Her maternal grandfather is Nicholas Romanov, Prince of Russia, which makes her a great-great-great-great granddaughter of Emperor Nicholas I of Russia. Romanoff married in 1999 and had two sons before the marriage ended. She then began a long-term relationship with Italian actor Giorgio Pasotti, with which she had a daughter. Romanoff is now married with Federico Alverà, they have a daughter together.

In 2016, she collaborated with Damiani and created The Romanov Collection of jewelry.  This collection is inspired by treasures of the Russian imperial  dynasty.

Filmography

Cinema

Television

References

External links

1979 births
Living people
Actresses from Rome
Italian people of Russian descent
Morganatic issue of Romanovs